Tommy Tutone is an American power pop band, known for its 1981 hit "867-5309/Jenny", which peaked at #4 on the Billboard Hot 100. Though some people consider the band to be a one-hit wonder, it did reach the Top 40 the year before with "Angel Say No".

History
Tommy Heath and Jim Keller founded the band in 1978 along with bassist Terry Nails (Steve Jones, Ozzy Osbourne), with Heath acting as the lead vocalist and rhythm guitarist, also playing keyboards on occasion; Keller played lead guitar and Terry Nails playing bass and providing supporting vocals.  Heath and Keller were the only constant members of Tommy Tutone during the band's heyday, and the lineup featured a rotating membership of bassists and drummers. Bassist Jon Lyons (original name Jonathan Lyons Terlep), who performed on "867-5309", replaced original bassist and founding member Terry Nails.  However, Lyons was soon replaced by Greg Sutton, later Pete Costello, and more recently Jimmy James. Mona Gnader, the bassist in Sammy Hagar's Waborita band, played with the band as well. Original drummer Kenny Johnson of Chris Isaak's band was replaced by Mickey Shine (Clover and drummer on the first Elvis Costello album) was replaced by Victor Carberry for the band's second album. Carberry was in turn replaced with Jerry Angel. John Cowsill of The Cowsills played percussion (and sang) on "867-5309/Jenny". From 2001-2010, the band consisted of Heath, James, Greg Georgeson (guitar), Andy Gauthier (drums). Tommy Heath became a computer analyst and software engineer and moved to Portland, Oregon. In 2007, the band signed a recording contract with Spectra Records. 

In 2017, with the addition of Steve Fister (Steppenwolf, Lita Ford) on guitar, Jimmy James switched to drums and the band released the single "My Little Red Book".

Jim Keller went on to become the director of Philip Glass's publishing company, Dunvagen Music Publishers.  He still performs in New York City.

In 2019, the band released their first studio album since 1998, Beautiful Ending.

Discography

Studio albums

Singles

References

External links
 
 
 Official Tutone Facebook page
 Bay Area Bands link
 Interview 2014: Rocker Magazine "Tommy Tutone: More Than A Number" 

Rock music groups from California
American power pop groups
American pop rock music groups
Musical groups established in 1978
Columbia Records artists
People from Willits, California